Tujerdi Rural District is a rural district (dehestan) in Sarchehan District, Bavanat County, Fars Province, Iran. At the 2006 census, its population was 6,341, in 1,496 families.  The rural district has 17 villages.

References 

Rural Districts of Fars Province
Bavanat County